The 2019 Campeonato Brasileiro Série C was a football competition held in Brazil, equivalent to the third division. The competition started on 27 April and ended on 6 October 2019.

Twenty teams competed in the tournament, twelve returning from the 2018 season, four promoted from the 2018 Campeonato Brasileiro Série D (Ferroviário, Treze, São José and Imperatriz), and four relegated from the 2018 Campeonato Brasileiro Série B (Paysandu, Sampaio Corrêa, Juventude and Boa Esporte).

Confiança, Juventude, Náutico and Sampaio Corrêa qualified for the semi-finals and were promoted to the 2020 Campeonato Brasileiro Série B.

Náutico defeated Sampaio Corrêa 5–3 on aggregate in the finals to win their first title.

Teams

Number of teams by state

Personnel

Group stage
In the group stage, each group was played on a home-and-away round-robin basis. The teams were ranked according to points (3 points for a win, 1 point for a draw, and 0 points for a loss). If tied on points, the following criteria would be used to determine the ranking: 1. Wins; 2. Goal difference; 3. Goals scored; 4. Head-to-head (if the tie is only between two teams). If tied on aggregate, the away goals rule would be used (except if both teams shared the same stadium); 5. Fewest red cards; 6. Fewest yellow cards; 7. Draw in the headquarters of the Brazilian Football Confederation (Regulations Article 15).

The top four teams of each group advanced to the quarter-finals of the knockout stages.

Group A

Results

Group B

Results

Final Stages
Starting from the quarter-finals, the teams played a single-elimination tournament with the following rules:
Each tie was played on a home-and-away two-legged basis, with the higher-seeded team hosting the second leg.
If tied on aggregate, the away goals rule would not be used, extra time would not be played, and the penalty shoot-out would be used to determine the winner (Regulations Article 16).

Starting from the semi-finals, the teams were seeded according to their performance in the tournament. The teams were ranked according to overall points. If tied on overall points, the following criteria would be used to determine the ranking: 1. Overall wins; 2. Overall goal difference; 3. Draw in the headquarters of the Brazilian Football Confederation (Regulations Article 17).

Bracket

Quarter-finals
The matches were played from 31 August to 9 September 2019.

|}

Group C

Tied 2–2 on aggregate, Náutico won on penalties and advanced to the semi-finals

Group D

Juventude won 4–0 on aggregate and advanced to the semi-finals

Group E

Sampaio Corrêa won 3–2 on aggregate and advanced to the semi-finals

Group F

Confiança won 2–1 on aggregate and advanced to the semi-finals

Semi-finals

The matches were played from 14 to 22 September 2019.

|}

Group G

Tied 3–3 on aggregate, Náutico won on penalties and advanced to the finals

Group H

Sampaio Corrêa won 3–0 on aggregate and advanced to the finals

Finals

The matches were played on 29 September and 6 October 2019.

|}

Group I

Top goalscorers

References 

Campeonato Brasileiro Série C seasons
3